This is a list of Australian artists.

A

 Anita Aarons (1912–2000): sculptor
 Harold Abbott (1906–1986): painter
 Ian Abdulla (1947–2011): Ngarrindjeri naive artist
 Abdul Abdullah (born 1986): multimedia artist
 Jack Absalom (1927–2019): artist, author and adventurer
 Louis Abrahams (1852–1903): painter, etcher
 Tate Adams (1922–2017): artist
 Joyce Allan (1896–1966): scientific illustrator
 Micky Allan (born 1944): photographer
 Beverly Allen (born 1945): botanical artist
 Davida Allen (born 1951): painter, film maker and writer
 Mary Cecil Allen (1893–1962): painter, writer
 Mary Morton Allport (1806–1895): lithographer, etcher and engraver, landscapes and miniatures
 Ernie Althoff (born 1950): musician, composer, instrument builder, and visual artist
 Tony Ameneiro (born 1959): artist, printmaker
 Rick Amor (born 1948): artist and figurative painter
 Roy Ananda (born 1980): sculptor
 Brook Andrew (born 1970): contemporary artist
 Daisy Andrews (c. 1934/1935–2015): Aboriginal painter
 Garry Andrews (born 1957): painter, printmaker and art teacher
 George French Angas (1822–1886): painter
 James Angus (born 1970): sculptor
 Giulio Anivitti (1850–1881): artist, art teacher, portrait painter and gallery curator
 Douglas Annand (1903–1976): graphic designer and artist
 Jean Appleton (1911–2003): prize-winning painter, printmaker, art teacher
 Silvio Apponyi (born 1949): German-Australian sculptor
 Howard Arkley (1951–1999): painter of houses, architecture, and suburbia
 Hany Armanious (born 1962): artist
 Elizabeth Armstrong (artist) (1859–1930): artist and art teacher
 Ian Armstrong (1923–2005): painter and printmaker 
 Alison Marjorie Ashby (1901–1987): botanical artist 
 James Ashton (1859–1935): artist and arts educator
 Julian Ashton (1851–1942): artist and teacher
 Julian Howard Ashton (1877–1964): journalist, writer, artist and critic
 Will Ashton (1881–1963): artist and gallery director
 Olive Ashworth (1915–2000): textile designer
 Estelle Asmodelle (born 1964): abstract artist, musician, and academic
 Mireille Astore (born 1961): artist, writer and film maker
 Michael Atchison OAM (1933–2009): South Australian cartoonist
 Louisa Atkinson (1834–1872): illustrator, botanist, writer
 Yvonne Audette (born 1930): painter
 J. Muir Auld (1879–1942): painter of landscapes and figure subjects
 Daryl Austin (born 1964): painter and arts education
 Narelle Autio (born 1969): photographer

Back to top

B

 Joseph Backler (1813–1895): English-born Australian painter
 Herbert Badham (1899–1961): realist painter
 Thomas Baines (1820–1875): English artist and explorer of British colonial southern Africa and Australia
 Jeannie Baker (born 1950): English-born children's picture book author and artist
 Maringka Baker (born c. 1952): painter
 Normand Baker (1908–1955): artist, winner of 1937 Archibald Prize
 Arthur Baker-Clack (1877–1955): expatriate Impressionist painter of landscapes, resident of the Étaples art colony
 Marie-Claire Baldenweg (born 1954): Swiss–Australian contemporary artist
 George Baldessin (1912–1978): Italian–Australian artist
 Alice Marian Ellen Bale (18751955): exhibited with the Melbourne Society of Women Painters and Sculptors
 Percival Ball (1845–1900): English sculptor active in Australia
 Sydney Ball (1933–2017): abstract painter
 Bronwyn Bancroft (born 1958): fashion designer, illustrator
 Rosalie (Ros) Edith Bandt (born 1951): composer, sound artist, academic and performer
 William Barak (1824–1903): Aboriginal artist of traditional Indigenous life and encounters with Europeans
 Irene Barberis (born 1953): English-born painter, installation artist, drawer
 Caroline Barker (1894–1988): painter 
 Elsie Barlow (1876–1948): painter, printmaker
 Gustave Barnes (1877–1921): English violinist, painter and sculptor
 Virginia Barratt (born 1959): researcher, artist, writer and performer
 Jeremy Barrett (born 1936): artist
 Ethel Barringer (1883–1925): etcher
 Gwen Barringer (1882–1960): watercolourist
 Herbert Page Barringer (1886–1946): watercolourist
 Del Kathryn Barton (born 1972): artist, winner of 2008 and 2013 Archibald Prizes
 Margaret Baskerville (1861–1930): Victorian sculptor and painter
 Tom Bass (1916–2010): sculptor
 Edward La Trobe Bateman (1861–1897): painter, book illuminator, draughtsman and garden designer
 H. M. Bateman (1887–1970): humorous artist and cartoonist
 Piers Maxwell Dudley-Bateman (aka Piers Bateman)(born 1947): landscape painter
 Terry Batt (born 1949): artist and sculptor
 Rex Battarbee (1893–1973): painter
 Ferdinand Bauer (1760–1826): Austrian botanical illustrator
 Lionel Bawden (born 1974): artist
 Clark Beaumont (formed 2010) (Sarah Clark and Nicole Beaumont), video, performance art
 John Beard (born 1943): painter, winner of 2006 Wynne Prize and 2007 Archibald Prize
 John Watt Beattie (1859–1930): photographer
 Christopher Beaumont (born 1961): still life painter
 Clarice Beckett (1887–1935): painter
 Paddy Bedford (1922–2007): Indigenous artist and architect
 Bianca Beetson: Aboriginal artist
 Marcus Beilby (born 1951): artist, winner of 1987 Sulman Prize
 George Bell (1878–1966): painter who studied in London and Paris
 Richard Bell (born 1953): painter who courted controversy
 Robert Stewart Bell AM (1946–2018): artist in ceramics and textiles and arts curator
 Lisa Bellear (1961–2006): photographer, poet, dramatist, comedian
 Jean Bellette (1908–1991): painter
 Allana Beltran: performance artist
 Jason Benjamin (born 1971): painter, winner of 2005 Archibald Prize
 Anthony Bennett (born 1966): painter, Archibald Prize finalist 2008, 2009
 Gordon Bennett (1955–2014): Aboriginal artist
 Jane Bennett (born 1960): painter
 Portia Mary Bennett (1898–1989): painter
 Stephen Benwell (born 1953): ceramicist
 Moira Bertram (1929–?): comic artist, illustrator
 Kevin Best (1932–2012): artist, awarded the Order of Australia (OAM)
 Kate Beynon (born 1970): artist 
 Charles Billich (born 1934): artist 
 Asher Bilu (born 1936): painter and sculptor
 Vivienne Binns (born 1940): artist, awarded the Order of Australia (OAM)
 Karna Maria Birmingham (1900–1987): artist, illustrator and print maker
 Dorrit Black (1891–1951): painter, printmaker
 Charles Blackman (1928–2018): landscape artist
 Freya Blackwood (born 1975): illustrator, special effects artist
 Florence Turner Blake (1873–1959): painter
 Robin Blau (born 1946): design artist, sculptor, jeweller
 Peter Michael Blayney (1920–2014): artist
 Godfrey Blow (born 1948): artist, founder of the Perth Stuckists
 Elise Blumann (1897–1990): German-born artist who achieved recognition as an Expressionist painter
 Thomas Bock (1793–1855): portraitist
 Wim Boissevain (born 1927): painter
 Peter Bonner (born 1964): artist
 Susie Bootja Bootja Napaltjarri (c. 1935–2003): painter
 David Booker (born 1954): Australian contemporary sculptor
 Jeremy Boot (born 1948): Australian wildlife painter
 Peter Booth (born 1940): figurative and abstract painter
 Marion Borgelt (born 1954): contemporary painter and mixed-media artist
 Polly Borland (born 1959): photographer
 Nancy Borlase (1914–2006): New Zealand-born landscape-based abstract painter and portraitist
 Paul Boston (born 1952): artist
 Stella Bowen (1893–1947): painter
 William Leslie Bowles (1885–1954): sculptor and medallist
 Arthur Boyd (1920–1999): portraitist, member of the Boyd artistic dynasty
 Daniel Boyd (born 1982): painter, sculptor and installation artist
 David Boyd (1924–2011): artist of symbolic and historical paintings, member of the Boyd artistic dynasty
 Doris Boyd (1888–1960): painter, ceramist
 Emma Minnie Boyd (1858–1936): painter
 Guy Boyd (1923–1988): sculptor, member of the Boyd artistic dynasty
 Merric Boyd (1888–1959): ceramicist, painter, and sculptor, member of the Boyd artistic dynasty
 Penleigh Boyd (1890–1923): landscape painter, member of the Boyd artistic dynasty
 Robert Boynes (born 1942): contemporary painter
 John Brack (1920–1999): painter, member of Antipodeans Group
 Godwin Bradbeer (born 1950): figurative drawing
 Pat Brassington (born 1942): photographer, digital artist
 Kate Breakey (born 1957): photographer
 Angela Brennan (born 1960): painter, ceramist
 Florence Broadhurst (1899–1977): designer
 Horace Brodzky (1885–1969): artist
 Gracius Broinowski (1837–1913): artist and ornithologist
 David Bromley (born 1960): artist
 Donald Brook (1927–2018): artist
 Anmanari Brown (born c. 1930): painter
 Nyuju Stumpy Brown (1924–2011): Wangkatjungka Indigenous Australian painter
 Andrew Browne (born 1960): figurative painter
 Richard Browne (1771–1824): artist and illustrator
 Lina Bryans (1909–2000): painter
 Charles David Jones Bryant (1883–1937): marine artist
 Ernest Buckmaster (1897–1968): painter, winner of the Archibald Prize in 1932
 Knud Bull (1811–1889): Norwegian painter and counterfeiter transported to Australia
 Norma Bull (1906–1980): painter, printmaker and etcher
 Rupert Bunny (1864–1947): painter of landscapes, figure studies, and scenes drawn from mythology and literature
 Ian Burn (1939–1993): conceptual artist
 Peter Burns (born 1924): architect and artist
 Jane Burton (born 1966): photographer
 William Bustard (1894–1973): stained glass artist
 Louis Buvelot (1814–1888): Swiss-born landscape painter who emigrated to Australia

Back to top

C

 Nicholas Caire (1837–1916): photographer
 Peter Callas (born 1952): video artist
 H. H. Calvert (1870–1923): artist
 Cressida Campbell (born 1960): printmaker
 Joan Campbell (1925–1997): ceramist
 Robert Campbell (1902–1972): painter and gallery director
 Jane Cannan (1822–1861): painter, drawer
 Jack Carington Smith (1908–1972): artist and teacher from Tasmania who won the Archibald Prize in 1963
 Ethel Carrick (1872–1952): painter
 Tom Carrington (1843–1918): journalist, political cartoonist and illustrator
 James Howe Carse (c. 1819–1900): British–Australian painter who specialized in landscapes
 Jeff Carter (1928–2010): photographer, filmmaker and author
 Maie Casey (1892–1983): aviator, poet, librettist, biographer, memoirist and artist
 Judy Cassab (1920–2015): painter, twice won the Archibald Prize
 John Cato (1926—2011): photographer and influential lecturer in photography.
 Gino Cavicchioli (born 1957): Australian-born bust sculptor now living in Canada
 Neville Henry Cayley (1854–1903): bird artist, ornithologist 
 Neville William Cayley (1886–1950): bird artist, author, ornithologist
 Harold Cazneaux (1878–1953): pictorialist photographer
 Alex Cearns: photographer
 Mutlu Çerkez (1964–2005): conceptual artist
 Queenie Chan (born 1974): Hong Kong-born comic artist
 Nicholas Chevalier (1828–1902): Russian-born artist, illustrator in lithography and water-colour
 Gunter Christmann (1936–2013): German-born Australian painter
 Ernest William Christmas (1863–1918)
 Betty Churcher (1931–2015): arts administrator and painter
 Peter Churcher (born 1964): painter of portraits and figures in a realistic style
 Marc Clark (1923–2021): sculptor and print maker
 Bree Kristel Clarke: photographer
 Joseph Augustine Clarke (1844–1890): artist, painter, journal illustrator and arts-teacher
 Richard Clements (1951–1999): painter
 James Clifford (1936–1987): painter 
 Densey Clyne (1922–2019): Welsh-born photographer, naturalist, writer
 George James Coates (1869–1930): portrait painter
 John Coburn (1925—2006): painter, teacher, tapestry designer and printmaker
 R. Sidney Cocks (1866–1939): artist
 Margaret Coen (1909–1993): artist 
 Ola Cohn (1892–1964): sculptor
 Colin Colahan (1897–1987): painter and sculptor, died in Italy
 Bindi Cole (born 1975): photographer, video artist, installation artist
 Alfred Coleman (1890—1952): painter
 George Collingridge (1847–1931): writer and illustrator 
 Albert Collins (1883–1951): painter, teacher and actor
 Amalie Sara Colquhoun (1894–1974): painter
 Charles Conder (1868–1909): English-born painter of the Heidelberg School who emigrated to Australia
 Daniel Connell (born 1970): artist
 Kevin Connor (born 1932): artist, two-time winner of the Archibald Prize
 Sylvia Convey (born 1948): painter
 Michael Cook (born 1968): photographic artist
 William Delafield Cook (1936–2015): artist
 Justine Cooper (born 1968): animator, video artist, photographer
 William T. Cooper (1934–2015): scientific painter of birds, recipient of a Gold Medal for Distinction in Natural History Art from The Academy of Natural Sciences, Drexel University 
 Yvette Coppersmith (born 1980): painter
 Edith Corbet (1846–1920): landscape painter
 Olive Cotton (1911–2003): photographer 
 Noel Counihan (1913–1986): social realist painter
 Virginia Coventry (born 1940): photographer
 Theodora Cowan (1868–1949): sculptor, painter
 Steve Cox (born 1958): painter and watercolourist
 Sybil Mary Frances Craig (1901–1989): painter
 Fred Cress (1938–2009): artist who won the Archibald Prize in 1988
 Brenda Croft (born 1964): artist, photographer, curator
 Peggie Crombie (1901–1984): painter
 Ray Crooke (1922–2015): portrait artist, Archibald Prize winner in 1969
 Grace Crowley (1890–1979): abstract artist
 Francis R. Crozier (1883–1948): war records artist
 Adam Cullen (1965–2012): artist, winner of the Archibald Prize in 2000
Frank Cullen (1926–2010) landscape artist
 Janet Cumbrae Stewart (1883–1960): painter
 Elisabeth Cummings (born 1934): multi-award-winning artist and teacher
 James Waltham Curtis (c. 1839–1901): painter, illustrator, and photographic colourist

Back to top

D

 Ante Dabro (born 1938): Croatian-born artist/sculptor and art teacher
 Johnnie Dady (born 1961): installation artist
 Lindsay Daen (1923–2001): New Zealand-born sculptor and artist
 John Dahlsen (born 1963): contemporary environmental artist
 Richard Daintree (1832–1878): photographer
 Roy Dalgarno (1910–2001): social realist artist
 Anne Dangar (1885–1951): painter, potter
 Dolly Nampijinpa Daniels (1936–2004): painter
 Aleks Danko (born 1950): performance artist and sculptor 
 Alfred James Daplyn (1844–1926): painter
 William Dargie (1912–2003): painter especially of portrait paintings who won the Archibald Prize eight times
 Vicki Darken (1923–2014): landscape painter
 Bessie Davidson (1879–1965): painter
 David Davies (1864–1939): painter
 Edward Davies (1852–1927): architect and arts administrator
 Olive Blanche Davies (1884–1976/7): botanical illustrator
 Paul Davies (born 1979): artist
 John Davis (1936–1999): sculptor
 John (Francis) Davis (born 1958): artist
 Lawrence Daws (born 1927): painter and printmaker of watercolour, drawing, screenprints, etchings and monotypes
 Janet Dawson (born 1935): painter
 Charles Hubert de Castella (1825–1907): Swiss-Australian writer, artist and winemaker
 Geoffrey de Groen (born 1938): painter of abstract art
 Roy De Maistre (1894–1968): artist who explored the relationship of colour harmony to musical harmony
 Destiny Deacon (born 1957): photographer
 Andrew Dearman: photographer
 Wolfgang Degenhardt (1924–1993): German-born artist often of religious art
 Dennis Del Favero (born 1953): artist and academic
 Paul Delprat (born 1942): painter and illustrator, Principal of the Julian Ashton Art School
 Linda Dement (born 1960): photographer, digital artist
 Aileen Dent (1890–1978): painter
 Stuart Devlin (1931–2018): artist and metalworker
 William Dexter (1818–1860): English-Australian painter
 Maggie Diaz (1925–2016): photographer
 Robert Dickerson (1924–2015): figurative painter
 Desmond Digby (1933–2015): New Zealand-born stage designer, painter and illustrator of children's books
 Silvester Diggles (1817–1880): artist and musician
 William Dobell (1899–1970): sculptor and painter who won the Archibald Prize three times
 James Dodd (born 1977): painter, sculptor and street artist
 Ken Done (born 1940): artist, especially of design work
 Annie Dorrington (1866–1926): painter, flag designer
 Matt Doust (1984–2013): artist, finalist in the 2011 Archibald Prize
 John Dowie (1915–2008): painter, sculptor and teacher
 Julie Dowling (born 1969): Badimaya Australian artist
 Robert Hawker Dowling (1827–1886): colonial artist
 Russell Drysdale (1912–1981): painter of abstract and surrealist art
 William Duke (1814–1853): Irish-born Australian artist
 Karl Duldig (1902–1986): Austrian-Australian sculptor
 Slawa Duldig (1901–1975): Austrian-Australian inventor, artist, interior designer and teacher
 Brian Dunlop (1938–2009): still life and figurative painter
 Jan Dunn (ceramicist) (1940–2002): ceramicist
 Frank Dunne (1898–1937): cartoonist
 Max Dupain (1911–1992): photographer
 Elizabeth Durack (1915–2000): Western Australian artist and writer
 Ivan Durrant (born 1947): painter, performance artist and writer
 Benjamin Duterrau (1768–1851): English painter, etcher, engraver, sculptor and art lecturer who emigrated to Tasmania
 Ludwik Dutkiewicz (1921–2008): Ukrainian-born naturalized Australian artist
 Władysław Dutkiewicz (1918–1999): Polish-born naturalized Australian artist
 Olive Dutton Green (1878–1930): painter
 Geoffrey Dyer (born 1947): artist who won the Archibald Prize in 2003
 Moya Dyring (1909–1967): painter
 Ambrose Dyson (1876–1913): illustrator and political cartoonist
 Will Dyson (1880–1938): illustrator

Back to top

E

 Augustus Earle (1793–1832): London-born travel artist who spent time painting in Australia
 Stephen Eastaugh (born 1960): artist
 Lindsay Edward (1919–2007): abstract artist, mosaicist and teacher
 Agnes Edwards (c. 1873–1928): Aboriginal handicraft maker known for feather flowers.
 Margery Edwards (1933–1989): mixed media artist, painter
 Sandy Edwards (born 1948): photographer 
 Bonita Ely (born 1946): performance artist
 Esther Erlich: figurative painter, winner 1998 Moran prize and 2000 Archibald People's Choice Award
 Jessie Lavington Evans (1860–1943), painter
 Joyce Evans (1929–2019): photographer
 Lina Eve (born 1946): figurative painter, singer/songwriter, photographer, and film maker
 Miles Evergood (1871–1939): artist
 Raymond Boultwood "Ray" Ewers (1917–1998): sculptor
 Gladstone Eyre (1862–1933): portrait artist and landscape painter
 John Eyre (1771–?): painter and engraver

Back to top

F

 Facter, aka Fletcher Andersen: street artist/painter
 David Fairbairn (born 1949): painter and printmaker
 Ian Fairweather (1891–1974): painter who combined western and Asian influences in his work
 Adrian Feint (1894–1971): artist, noted for his bookplate designs
 Susan Fereday (born 1959): artist, photographer
 Anne Ferran (born 1949): photographer
 Simon Fieldhouse (born 1956): painter of architecture with whimsical characters
 George Edmond Finey (1895–1987): New Zealand born artist
 Gerald Fitzgerald (1873–1935): artist
 Paul Desmond Fitzgerald (1922–2017): portrait painter
 Maude Edith Victoria Fleay (1869–1965): painter
 Herbert 'Bert' Flugelman (1923–2013): sculptor 
 Paul Foelsche (1931–1914): photographer 
 Ellis D Fogg aka Roger Foley (born 1942): Lumino Kinetic, Light Artist 
 Fiona Foley (born 1964): indigenous artist from Badtjala
 George Frederick Folingsby (1828–1891): Irish born Australian painter and art educator
 Nicholas Folland (born 1967): sculptor and arts educator
 Sue Ford (1943–2009): photographer
 Haughton Forrest (1826–1925): artist
 E. Phillips Fox (1865–1915): Naturalist painter
 Ivor Pengelly Francis (1906–1993): artist, art critic and teacher 
 Dale Frank (born 1959): contemporary artist
 Graham Fransella (born 1950): figurative and abstract painter
 William Frater (1890–1974), Scottish-born stained-glass designer and modernist painter
 Kristian Fredrikson (1940–2005): New Zealand-born stage and costume designer
 Harold Freedman (1915–1999): artist, renowned for his work in public murals
 Leonard French (1928–2017): painter and stained glass artist
 Zoe Freney: painter, arts writer and arts educator
 Thomas Friedensen (1879–1931): English-born artist in watercolour and oils, active in Australia
 Donald Friend (1915–1989): artist, writer and diarist
 Frederick Frith (1819–1871): English-born painter and photographer
 Douglas Fry (1872–1911): artist, especially of animal paintings
 Ella Fry (1916–1997): painter
 Merrick Fry (born 1950): artist
 Sam Fullbrook (1922–2004): artist, won the Archibald Prize in 1974
 Florence Fuller (1867–1946): painter
 Albert Henry Fullwood (1863–1930): artist who worked in black and white, oils, and watercolour

Back to top

G

 Kiley Gaffney (born 1970): performance artist, musician
 Ian Gardiner (1943–2008): artist 
 Silvana Gardner: visual artist, writer
 Rosalie Gascoigne (1917–1999): sculptor, primarily of found materials
 Marea Gazzard (1928–2013): sculptor, ceramist
 Esmond George (1888–1959): SA watercolor artist, World War II war artist and art critic
 Francis Giacco (born 1955): artist who won the Archibald Prize in 1993–1994
 Geoff Gibbons (born 1947): printmaker and arts educator
 May Gibbs (1877–1969): English Australian children's author, illustrator, and cartoonist
 Charles Web Gilbert (1867–1925): sculptor 
 Jeff Gilberthorpe (born 1939): English-born artist and art teacher
 Jackie Kurltjunyintja Giles (1944–2010): Manyjilyjarra painter
 Harry Pelling Gill (1855–1916): English-born artist and art teacher
 S. T. Gill (1818–1880): English-born draughtsman, watercolour painter, and photographer
 George Gittoes (born 1949): war artist using painting, drawing, photographs and video
 Shaun Gladwell (born 1972): video, performance, painting and sculpture
 Michaela Gleave (born 1980); conceptual installations
 James Gleeson (1915–2008): surrealist artist, poet, critic, writer and curator
 Harry Glover (artist) (c. 1810–1858): English artist in South Australia
 Henry H. Glover (c. 1827–1904): Australian artist, son of above 
 John Glover (artist) (1767–1849): English artist in Tasmania, not related
 Duncan Goldfinch (1888–1960): painter
 John Charles Goodchild (1898–1980): painter and art educator
 Agnes Goodsir (1864–1939): portrait painter
 Richard Goodwin (born 1953): artist, architect and professor of fine arts and design
 Julie Gough (born 1965): artist, writer and curator
 William Buelow Gould (1801–1853): English painter transported to Van Diemen's Land in 1826
 Peter Gouldthorpe (born 1954): artist, children's picture book author and illustrator
 James William Govett (1910–11 July 1998): impressionist painter
 Peter Benjamin Graham (1925–1987): visual artist, printer, and art theorist
 Peter Sebastian Graham (born 1970): artist, painter, printmaker and sculptor
 Alma Nungarrayi Granites (1955–2017): artist
 Siv Grava (born 1967): artist, winner of Doug Moran National Portrait Prize
 Virginia Grayson (born 1967): visual artist, winner of the Dobell Drawing Prize
 Sasha Grbich: installation artist
 Denise Green (born 1946): painter 
Jillian Green (born 1975); artist
 Olive Dutton Green (1878–1930): artist
 Rona Green (born 1972): artist
 Tom Green (1913–1981): painter, printmaker and art teacher
 Victor Greenhalgh (1900–1983): sculptor and teacher
 Francis Greenway (1777–1837): English-born architect 
 Guy Grey-Smith (1916–1981): painter, printmaker and ceramicist
 Vaughan Murray Griffin (1903–1992): print maker and painter
 Mabel "May" Grigg (1885–1969): painter
 Henry Gritten (c. 1818–1873): English painter
 Ann Grocott (born 1938): writer and painter
 Elioth Gruner (1882–1939): New Zealand-born painter, winner of the Wynne Prize seven times
 Rob Gutteridge (born 1954): English-born painter and arts educator
Marjorie Gwynne (1886-1958): painter
 Harold Frederick Neville Gye (1888–1967): cartoonist 

Back to top

H

 Emma Hack (born 1972): photographer
 Basil Hadley (1940–2006): born London, UK, arrived to Australia in 1965, printmaker and painter
 Robert Hague (born 1967): New Zealand-born artist 
 Fiona Hall (born 1953): contemporary visual artist
 Lindsay Bernard Hall (1859–1935): English-born Australian artist and art gallery director
 Deborah Halpern (born 1957): sculptor, mosaic artist, ceramist
 Stanislav "Stacha" Halpern (1919–1969): Polish Australian painter and sculptor
 Michelle Hamer (born 1975): tapestry artist
 Lyn Hancock: photographer, writer
 Henry Hanke (1901–1989): artist who won the Archibald Prize in 1934
 Marjorie Hann (1916–2011): South Australian cartoonist, painter and art teacher
 Robert Hannaford (born 1944): realist artist 
 Barbara Hanrahan (1939–1991): artist, printmaker and writer 
 Albert J. Hanson (1866–1914): landscape painter in both oil and water-colour
 Nicholas Harding (born 1956): artist who won the Archibald Prize in 2001
 Lily Nungarrayi Yirringali Jurrah Hargraves (born 1930): painter
 Pro Hart (1928–2006): father of the Outback painting movement
 Cecil Hartt (1884–1930): cartoonist
 Edmund Arthur Harvey (1907–1994): British-born Australian artist 
 Ponch Hawkes (born 1946): photographer
 Elaine Haxton (1909–1999): painter, printmaker, designer and commercial artist
 Louise Hearman (born 1963): figurative painter
 Ivor Hele (1912–1993): war artist for the Australian War Memorial, five times Archibald Prize winner
 Catherine Jenna Hendry (CJ Hendry) (born 1988): hyper-realistic, large-scale renderings using a scribbling technique
 Euan Heng (born 1945): Scottish-born painter and printmaker
 Lucien Henry (1850–1896): French painter in Sydney
 Bill Henson (born 1955): contemporary photographic artist
 Petr Herel (born 1943): Czechoslovakia-born printmaker, painter
 Sali Herman (1898–1993): Swiss-born war artist
 Bernard Hesling (1905–1987): British-born muralist and painter
 Joy Hester (1920–1960): modernist painter
 Hans Heysen (1877–1968): German painter of watercolours of the bush
 Nora Heysen (1911–2003): 1938 Archibald Prize winner and first women official war artist
 Dale Hickey (born 1937): painter and teacher
 J. J. Hilder (1881–1916): watercolourist from the Heidelberg School
 Charles Hill (1824–1915): engraver, painter and arts educator
 Robin Hill (born 1932): artist and writer
 Frank Hinder (1906–1992): painter, sculptor and art teacher
 Margel Hinder (1906–1995): Australian-American modernist sculptor 
 Ludwig Hirschfeld Mack (1893–1965): German/Australian artist
 Noela Hjorth (1940–2016): artist and builder of houses, known as living sculptures
 Robert Hoddle (1794–1881): surveyor and artist
 Christopher Hodges: artist and art gallery director
 Frank Hodgkinson (1919–2001): war artist
 Rayner Hoff (1894–1937): Isle of Man-born sculptor who lived and worked in Australia
 Robert Hollingworth (born 1947): painter, video artist, writer, novelist; winner of 1990 Sulman Prize
 Cherry Hood (born 1959): portraitist, won the 2002 Archibald Prize
 Gordon Hookey (born 1961): painter, sculptor
 Laurence Hope (born 1927): artist
 Livingston York Yourtee "Hop" Hopkins (1846–1927): American-born cartoonist
 Chris Horder (born 1976): won the Young Emerging Artist Award in the 2011 Mosman Art Prize
 Marie Horseman (1911–1974): cartoonist, illustrator, fashion designer
 Henry Leonardus van den Houten (1801–1879): Dutch-Australian painter, lithographer and art teacher
 Valma Howell (1896–1979): painter, actress
 Laurence Hotham Howie (1876–1963): South Australian sculptor, painter, and art teacher
 John Howley (born 1931): painter
 Frank Hurley (1885–1962): photographer, filmmaker and adventurer
 Polly Hurry (1883–1963): painter
 Margot Hutcheson (born 1952): British-born painter

Back to top

I

 Nelson Illingworth (1862–1926): English-born sculptor
 Kylie InGold (born 1962): painter of the fairy and fantasy genre
 Robert Ingpen (born 1936): graphic designer, illustrator, and author
 Adelaide Ironside (1831–1867): painter
 Pamela Irving (born 1960): ceramicist, mosaicist and writer
 Jean Isherwood (1911–2006): painter
 Linde Ivimey (born 1965): sculptor

Back to top

J

 Kenneth Jack (1924–2006): watercolour painter, and printmaker, member of RWS
 Robert Jacks (1943–2014): painter, sculptor and printmaker
 James R. Jackson (1882–1975): artist, primarily of Sydney harbor
 Roy Jackson (1944–2013): artist
 Lionel Jago (1882–1953): artist
 Ann James (born 1952): children's book illustrator, graphic designer
 Thancoupie Gloria Fletcher James (1937–2011): ceramicist, painter and textile artist, Aboriginal artist
 Gil Jamieson (1934–1992): painter of figurative art works, landscape art works, and portraits
 Bob Jenyns (born 1944): humorous and figurative sculpture, painting, drawing and prints
 Natalie Jeremijenko (born 1966): installation artist
 Carol Jerrems (1949–1980): photographer
 Clytie Jessop (1929–2017): artist, actress, screenwriter and director
 Guo Jian (born 1962): painter, sculptor, photographer
 Natasha Johns-Messenger: installation artist, photographer
 George Johnson (1926–2021): painter of modernist art, especially geometric abstraction
 Roger Kirk Hayes Johnson (1922–1991): architect, planner, potter, painter, sculptor, writer and educator
 Anne Jolliffe (1933–2021): animator
 Eric Jolliffe (1907–2001): cartoonist and illustrator on outback themes
 Henry Jones (1826–1911): photographer
 Joe Jonsson (1890–1963): Swedish-born cartoonist 
 Justus Jorgensen (1893–1975): artist and architect
 Ellen Jose (1951–2017): photographer, printmaker
 Loui Jover (born 1967): painter, artist
 Anne Judell (born 1942): artist, winner of the 2011 Dobell Prize
 Robert Juniper (1929–2012): illustrator, art teacher, sculptor and printmaker

Back to top

K

 Louis Kahan (1905–2002): artist born in Vienna who won the Archibald Prize in 1962
 Kitty Kantilla (1928–2003): painter, printmaker, sculptor
 Shokufeh Kavani (born 1970): Iranian-born painter
 Barry Kay (1932–1985): stage and costume designer 
 Hanna Kay: Israeli-born painter
 Jennifer Keeler-Milne (born 1961): painter, drawer
 Anwen Keeling (born 1976): portrait painter
 David Keeling (born 1951): artist
 John Kelly (born 1965): artist 
 Rik Kemp (born 1939)
 Roger Kemp (1907–1987): artist, especially of transcendental abstraction
 Franz Kempf (born 1926)
 Tjungkara Ken (born 1969): painter
 Caroline Kennedy-McCracken (born 1967): musician, painter, sculptor
 Rachel Khedoori (born 1964): painter, sculptor
 Toba Khedoori (born 1964): mixed media painter
 Patrick Kilvington (1922–1990): artist of musters, round-ups and horses in motion
 Grahame King (1915–2008): master printmaker
 Inge King (1915–2016): German-born sculptor
 Leah King-Smith (born 1956): photographer
 Anita Klein (born 1960): painter, printmaker
 Robert Klippel (1920–2001): sculptor
 Anastasia Klose (born 1978): performance artist, installation artist
 Michael Kmit (1910–1981): Ukrainian painter who spent twenty-five years in Australia and died in Sydney
 Sue Kneebone: artist and arts educator
 Emily Kngwarreye (1910–1996): Aboriginal artist from the Utopia community
 William Dunn Knox (1820–1945): painter, member of the Victorian Artists Society
 Lisette Kohlhagen (1890–1969): painter
 Theo Koning (born 1950): Dutch-born Western Australian painter, sculptor, printmaker and art teacher
 Derek Kreckler (born 1952): multi-media visual artist

Back to top

L

 Vida Lahey (1882–1968): painter
 Rosemary Laing (born 1959): photographer
 George Lambert (1873–1930): artist of portrait paintings and war artist
 Pat Larter (1936–1996): mail artist, photographer, performance artist, painter
 Richard Larter (1929–2014): painter, often identified as one of Australia's few highly recognisable pop artists
 David Larwill (1956–2011): artist 
 Janet Laurence (born 1947): mixed media artist, installation artist
 Peter Laverty (1926–2013): painter, print maker, art educator and gallery director
 George Lawrence (1901–1981): painter in the impressionist style
 Donald Laycock (born 1931): painter
 Sam Leach (born 1973): figurative painter, winner of 2010 Archibald Prize and Wynne Prize
 Alun Leach-Jones (1937–2017): painter, sculptor, printmaker
 Bill Leak (1956–2017): cartoonist and painter
 Percy Leason (1889–1959): cartoonist, painter
 Lindy Lee (born 1954): sculptor, painter 
 Derwent Lees (1884–1931): landscape painter
 Laurence Le Guay (1916–1990): photographer
 Fred Leist (1878–1945): muralist and war artist
 Kerrie Lester (1953–2016): artist
 Michael Leunig (born 1945): cartoonist, poet and cultural commentator
 Margo Lewers (1908–1978): interdisciplinary abstract artist 
 John Lewin (1770–1819): English-born artist of natural history, active in Australia
 Wilbraham Frederick Evelyn Liardet (1799–1878): hotelier, water-colour artist and historian
 Colonel William Light (1786–1839): British naval and army officer and a painter, the first Surveyor-General of the Colony of South Australia 
 Peter Lik (born 1959): fine art photographer
 Kevin Lincoln (born 1941): artist
 Daryl Lindsay (1889–1976): sketcher, illustrator, and art critic
 Joan Lindsay (1896–1984): author
 Lionel Lindsay (1874–1961): artist specializing in etching and engraving
 Norman Lindsay (1879–1969): sculptor, writer, editorial cartoonist and scale modeler
 Percy Lindsay (1870–1952): landscape painter, illustrator and cartoonist
 Ruby Lindsay (1885–1919): illustrator, painter
 Anthony Lister (born 1980): artist specializing in street art, expressionism, and pop art
 W. Lister Lister (1859–1943): painter, won the Wynne Prize seven times
 Norman Lloyd (1895–1983): landscape painter
 Tony Lloyd (born 1970): figurative painter
 Leonard Long (1911–2013): painter
 Sydney Long (1871–1955): painter, etcher, and teacher
 John Longstaff (1861–1941): painter, war artist and a five-time winner of the Archibald Prize
 Will Longstaff (1879–1953): painter and war artist
 Keith Looby (born 1940): artist who won the Archibald Prize in 1984
 Loongkoonan (c. 1910–2018): painter, Aboriginal elder
 Steve Lopes (born 1971): figurative painter
 Josh Lord (born 1972): artist specializing in acrylic house paint
 Gretta Louw (born 1981): interdisciplinary artist working across digital media, installation, drawing, and textiles
 Fiona Lowry (born 1974): painter
 Joseph Lycett (c. 1774–1827): English-born portrait and miniature painter, active in Australia
 Elwyn (Jack) Lynn (1917–1997): artist, author, art critic and curator

Back to top

M

 Andrew MacCormac (1826–1918): portrait painter
 Stewart Angus MacFarlane (born 1953): figurative painter
 Norman Macgeorge (1872–1952): artist and art critic
 William Priestly MacIntosh (1857–1930): sculptor
 Sir Edgar Bertram Mackennal (1863–1931): sculptor and medallist
 Chips Mackinolty (born 1954): artist printmaking and journalist 
 Euan MacLeod (born 1956): New Zealand artist who won the Archibald Prize in 1999
 William Macleod (1850–1929): artist and a partner in The Bulletin
 Matthew James MacNally (1873–1943): watercolourist
 Mary Macqueen (1912–1994): printmaker, mixed media artist
 Bea Maddock (1934–2016): artist combining printing with encaustic painting and installation art
 Guy Maestri (born 1974): painter, winner of 2009 Archibald Prize
 Ma Mahood (1901–1989): painter, ceramist, printmaker
 Jeffrey Makin (born 1943): artist, art critic, and Director of Port Jackson Press Australia
 David Malangi (1927–1999): bark painter, printmaker, carver, designer
 Henri Mallard (1884–1967): photographer
 Gillian Mann (1939–2007): printmaker
 Diane Mantzaris (born 1962): digital artist, printmaker
 Paul Margocsy (born 1945): watercolourist
 Banduk Marika (1954–2021): indigenous Australian artist and printmaker
 Wandjuk Marika (1927–1987): contemporary Indigenous Australian artist, actor, composer and land rights activist
 Stella Marks (1887–1985): best known as a portrait miniaturist
 Claude Marquet (1869–1920): political cartoonist
 Conrad Martens (1801–1878): English-born landscape artist active in Australia
 Monte Masi (born 1983): performance-based video artist
 John Mather (1848–1916): Scottish-Australian plein-air painter and etcher
 John Baxter Mather (1853–1940): Scottish-Australian journalist, newspaper proprietor, landscape painter and art critic
 John Mawurndjul (born 1952): indigenous artist in a traditional painting technique rarrk
 William James Maxwell (ca.1843–1903): Scottish-born sculptor
 Ursula Mayer (born 1970): multimedia artist based in London
 Daphne Mayo (1895–1982): sculptor
 Kathleen McArthur (1915–2001): botanical illustrator, environmentalist, naturalist
 Herbert McClintock (1906–1985): social realist artist
 Francis McComas (1875–1938): Australian-born artist who spent most of his adult life in California
 Georgiana McCrae (1804–1890): painter, diarist
 Frederick McCubbin (1855–1917): painter of the Heidelberg School
 Alan McLeod McCulloch (1907–1992): art historian and gallery director, cartoonist, and painter
 Francine McDougall: filmmaker, photographer
 Malcolm McGookin (born 1956): cartoonist, writer, painter, musician
 Raymond McGrath (1903–1977): architect, illustrator, printmaker and interior designer
 William Beckwith McInnes (1889–1939): portrait painter, winner of the Archibald Prize seven times
 Arthur McIntyre (1945–2003): artist and art critic
 Alexander McKenzie (born 1971): painter, a six times finalist of the Archibald Prize
 Queenie McKenzie (1930–1998): painter
 Tommy McRae (1835–1901): artist
 Clement Meadmore (1929–2005): Australian-American sculptor known for massive outdoor steel sculptures
 Penny Meagher (1935–1995): painter
 Lilian Marguerite Medland (1880–1955): illustrator, painter
 Charles Meere (1890–1961): English-Australian artist
 Dora Meeson (1869–1955): painter
 Annemieke Mein (born 1944): Dutch-born textile artist
 Max Meldrum (1875–1955): painter, winner of the Archibald Prize in 1939 and 1940
 Mortimer Luddington Menpes (1855–1938): Australian-born artist, author, printmaker and illustrator
 Mary Cockburn Mercer (1882–1963): painter
 Louisa Anne Meredith (1812–1895): Anglo/Australian writer and illustrator, also known as Louisa Anne Twamley
 Bertha Merfield (1869–1921): painter and muralist
 Vladas Meskenas (1916–2020): Sydney painter, born in Lithuania
 Bill Meyer (born 1942): artist who uses photography, film and music in his work
 mez (Mary-Anne Breeze): Australian-based Internet artist
 Margaret Michaelis-Sachs (1902–1985): Polish-born photographer
 Rodney Armour "Rod" Milgate (1934–2014): painter and playwright
 David Miller (born c.1950): painter
 Lewis Miller (born 1959): painter and visual artist, known for his portraits and figurative works, winner of 1998 Archibald Prize
 Peter Milne (born 1960): photographer and visual artist, known for documenting the Melbourne punk and comedy scenes in the 1970s and 80s
 Benjamin Edwin Minns (1863–1937): watercolourist
 Harold "Hal" Missingham (1906–1994): Australian artist, Director of the Art Gallery of New South Wales from 1945 to 1971, and president of the Australian Watercolour Institute from 1952 to 1955
 Jan Mitchell (1940–2008): painter, sculptor, illustrator, printmaker
 Robert Boyed Mitchell (1919–2002): abstract expressionist artist
 Joanne Mitchelson (born 1971): painter
 Tracey Moffat (born 1960): artist using primarily photography and video
 Ernest Edward Moffitt (1871–1899): artist 
 George Molnar (1910–1998): Hungarian-Australian cartoonist
 Jon Molvig (1923–1970): expressionist artist
 Reg Mombassa (born 1951): New Zealand-born artist and musician
 Milton Moon (1926–2019): potter, teacher and author
 Alan Moore (1914–2015): war artist 
 David Moore (1927–2003): photographer and photojournalist. 
 May and Mina Moore (1881–1931, 1882–1957): photographers
 Mirka Mora (1928–2018): French-born painter, sculptor, mosaic artist
 Harriet Morgan (1830–1907): natural history illustrator
 Sally Morgan (born 1951): Aboriginal author, scriptwriter and contemporary Indigenous Australian artist
 George Pitt Morison (1861–1946): painter and engraver
 Ethel Jackson Morris (1891–1985): illustrator
 Christine Morrow (born 1971): British-born visual artist
 Grant Mudford (born 1944): photographer
 Sally M. Nangala Mulda (born 1957): artist
 Patricia Mullins (born 1952): children's book illustrator
 Ginger Riley Munduwalawala (c.1936–2002): contemporary artist
 Arthur Murch (1902–1989): painter, winner of the Archibald Prize in 1949
 Les Murdoch (born 1957), pioneer of Aboriginal Op art Surrealism
 Wendy Murray (artist) (born 1974): print maker, painter, arts educator
 Vali Myers (1930–2003): artist who specialized in fine pen and ink drawings
 Patricia Moran (1944–2017): painter
 Bruce Munro (born 1959): dual nationality (Australian/Great Britain), primary medium light
 Tanya Myshkin (born 1961): printmaker

N

 Bardayal 'Lofty' Nadjamerrek (1926–2009): painter
 Mick Namarari Tjapaltjarri (1926–1998): painter
 Albert Namatjira (1902–1959): Indigenous Australian artist
 Rosella Namok (born 1979): Indigenous Australian artist
 Eubena Nampitjin (1921–2013): painter, teacher
Narputta Nangala (1933–2010)
 Frank Arthur Nankivell (1869–1959): artist and political cartoonist
 Daisy Jugadai Napaltjarri (c. 1955–2008): painter
 Molly Jugadai Napaltjarri (c. 1954–2011): painter
 Ngoia Pollard Napaltjarri (born c. 1948): painter
 Tjunkiya Napaltjarri (c. 1927–2009): painter
 Wintjiya Napaltjarri (born ca 1923 to 1934): painter
 Makinti Napanangka (c. 1930–2011): indigenous Australian artist
 Dorothy Napangardi (early 1950s–2013): painter
 Lily Kelly Napangardi (born c. 1948): painter
 Yalti Napangati (born c. 1970): painter
 Simeon Nelson (born 1964): sculptor and transdisciplinary artist
 Girolamo Nerli (1860–1926)
 Norie Neumark: American-born sound artist
 Albert Ernest Newbury (1891–1941): landscape and portrait painter
 Ann Newmarch (born 1945): painter, printmaker, sculptor
 Helmut Newton (1920–2004): German-Australian fashion photographer noted for his nude studies of women
 June Newton (1923–2021): photographer, actress
 Paul Newton (born 1961): portrait artist who has twice won the Archibald Prize
Mavis Ngallametta (1944–2019)
 Hilda Rix Nicholas (1884–1961): painter
 Peter Nicholson (born 1946): political cartoonist, caricaturist and sculptor
 Deborah Niland (born 1950)
 Kilmeny Niland (1950–2009)
 Sandro Nocentini (born 1966): painter
 Sidney Nolan (1917–1992): painter and printmaker
 Elizabeth May Norriss, later Bess Norriss Tait (1878–1939): artist
 James Northfield (1887–1973): graphic artist
 Rosaleen Norton (1917–1979): painter, occultist
 Naata Nungurrayi (born 1932): artist
 Charles Nuttall (1872–1934): artist noted for his illustrations
 Lena Nyadbi (born c. 1936): painter, installation artist

Back to top

O

 Carla O'Brien: installation artist
 Kathleen O'Brien (1914–1991): comic artist, illustrator, fashion artist
 Kathleen O'Connor (1876–1968): New Zealand-born painter
 Gabby O'Connor: New Zealand-based installation artist (born 1974)
 Peter O'Doherty (born 1958): musician and artist specializing in still life and suburbia
 Edward Officer (1871–1921): painter, Australian Art Association inaugural president
 John Armstrong Ogburn (1925–2010): painter. 
 Pixie O'Harris (1903–1991): Welsh-born illustrator, cartoonist, painter, author
 Dorothea "Dora" Adela Ohlfsen-Bagge (1869–1948): pianist, painter, sculptor, spy and particularly a medallist
 Bronwyn Oliver (1959–2006): sculptor
 Margaret Olley (1923–2011): painter specializing in still life
 Bernard Ollis (born 1951): contemporary painter 
 John Olsen (born 1928): landscape painter who won the Archibald Prize in 2005
 Lin Onus (1948–1996): Scottish–Koori Aboriginal artist
 Rosemary Opala (1923–2008): illustrator, writer, nurse
 Desiderius Orban (1884–1986): Hungarian-Australian painter, printmaker and teacher
 Christopher Orchard (born 1950): artist and arts educator
 Mandy Ord (born 1974): comic artist
 Raquel Ormella (born 1969): multimedia artist
 George Cross Thomas Orr (1882–1933): watercolourist
 Jill Orr (born 1952): performance artist, photographer, installation artist
 Joseph Stanislaus Ostoja-Kotkowski (1922–1994): Polish-Australian artist best known for his ground-breaking work in chromasonics, laser kinetics and 'sound and image' productions
 Ida Rentoul Outhwaite (1888–1960): children's book illustrator
 Robert Owen (born 1937): artist and curator

Back to top

P

 Josonia Palaitis: artist
 Wendy Paramor (1938–1975): artist
 Trent Parke (born 1971): photographer
 Roy Parkinson (1901–1945): watercolour artist
 Lenton Parr (1924–2003): sculptor and teacher
 Mike Parr (born 1945): performance artist and printmaker
 Allyson Parsons (born 1965): Australian landscape artist
 Peter Parsons (ceramic artist) (1951–1993): ceramic artist
 John Passmore (1904–1984): abstract expressionist painter
 Klytie Pate (1912–2010): studio potter
 John Ford Paterson (1851–1912): Scottish-born Australian artist
 Ambrose McCarthy Patterson (1877–1966): painter and printmaker
 Frances Wildt Pavlu (died 2016): art jeweller
 John Peart (1945–2013)
 Tom Peerless (1858–1896): artist
 John Perceval (1923–2000): artist of drawings, paintings, and ceramics
 Stieg Persson (born 1959): contemporary painter
 Bruce Petty (born 1929): political satirist and cartoonist
 Gloria Petyarre (born 1946): contemporary Indigenous Australian artist
 Jeanna Petyarre (born 1950): painter
 Kathleen Petyarre (1940–2018): painter
 Nancy Petyarre (1938–2009): contemporary Indigenous Australian artist
 Debra Phillips (born 1958): photographer, sculptor
 Patricia Piccinini (born 1965): mixed-media artist
 Shane Pickett (1957–2010): Nyoongar artist
 William Edwin Pidgeon (1909–1981): painter who won the Archibald Prize three times
 Julianne Pierce: new media artist, curator, art critic
 Gwyn Hanssen Pigott (1935–2013), ceramist
 W. C. Piguenit (1836–1914): landscape painter
 Anne Pincus (born 1961): painter, sculptor
 Carl Plate (1909–1977): painter, collage artist, sculptor, printmaker
 Evert Ploeg (born 1963): portrait painter
 Terrance Plowright (born 1949): contemporary and figurative sculptor
 Axel Poignant (1906–1986): photographer
 Leon Pole (1871–1951): artist associated with the Heidelberg School
 Rodney Pople (born 1952): artist 
 Pietro Porcelli (1872–1943): Italian-born sculptor
 Port Jackson Painter (active 1788–1790s): plant and animal watercolour artist(s) (identity unknown)
 Arthur Ted Powell (born 1947): landscape painter and printmaker
 Harold Septimus Power (1877–1951): artist
 Dr John Joseph Wardell Power (1881–1943): Modernist artist
 Cedar Prest (born 1940): stained glass artist
 Margaret Preston (1875–1963): modernist painter and printmaker
 Reg Preston (1917–2000): potter
 Thea Proctor (1879–1966): portrait painter and printmaker
 Geoffrey Proud (born 1946): artist who won the Archibald Prize in 1990
 John Skinner Prout (1805–1876): English-born painter of lithographs, watercolours and oils
 Oswald Pryor (1881–1971): cartoonist
 Clifton Pugh (1924–1990): painter of landscapes and portraiture
 Shirley Purdie (born 1948): contemporary Indigenous Australian artist
 Peter Purves Smith (1912–1949): painter
 Minnie Pwerle (1910–2006): contemporary Indigenous Australian artist

Back to top

Q

 Ben Quilty (born 1973): portrait painter and war artist, winner of 2011 Archibald Prize
 James Peter Quinn (1869–1951): portrait painter 

Back to top

R

 Melinda Rackham (born 1959): sculptor and Internet artist
 John Radecki (1865–1955): stained glass artist working in Australia
 Isobel "Iso" Rae (1860–1940): impressionist painter
 John Rae (1813–1900): administrator, painter and author
 Hugh Ramsay (1877–1906): artist 
 Richard John Randall (1869–1906): artist
 David Rankin (born 1946): New York-based painter
 Stanislav Rapotec AM (1913–1997): artist
 Henry Rayner (1902–1957): Australian artist known for his drypoint etchings
 Norma Redpath OBE (1928–2013): painter and sculptor
 Richard Read Sr. (ca. 1765 – ca. 1829): British-born artist who was sent to Australia as a convict.
 Lloyd Rees (1895–1998): landscape painter
 Alison Baily Rehfisch (1900–1974): painter
 Virgil Reilly (1892–1974): cartoonist, comic book artist and illustrator
 Susan Respinger (born 1982): Perth based artist
 Gladys Reynell (1881–1956): one of South Australia's earliest potters
 Jon Rhodes (born 1947): photographer
 Geoffrey Ricardo (born 1964): artist, printmaker and sculptor
 Charles Douglas Richardson (1853–1932): Victorian sculptor and painter
 William Ricketts (1898–1993): potter and sculptor of the arts and crafts movement
 John Rigby (1922–2012): painter of tropical and bush landscapes, genre works and portraits
 Paul Crispin Rigby AM (1924–2006): cartoonist
 Michael Riley (1960–2004): photographer, documentary filmmaker
 Ginger Riley Munduwalawala (1936–2002): painter
 Hilda Rix Nicholas (1884–1961): conservative post-impressionist painter
 Douglas Roberts (1919–1976): painter and art critic
 Ian Roberts (born 1952): bird and native vegetation painter
 Tom Roberts (1856–1931): artist and a member of the Heidelberg School
 Lynne Roberts-Goodwin (born 1954): photographer, video and installation artist
 Freda Rhoda Robertshaw (1916–1997): artist
 Ronald Charles Robertson-Swann OAM (born 1941): sculptor
 Donna Marie Robinson: digital artist
 Julia Robinson (born 1981): sculptor
 William Robinson (born 1936): painter and lithographer
 Charles Rodius (1802–1860): German-born artist, printmaker and architect
 Florence Aline Rodway (1881–1971): artist best known for her portraits
 Lisa Roet (born 1967): artist
 Andrew Rogers (born 1947): sculptor and land artist
 Robert Rooney (1937–2017): artist and art critic
 Herbert Rose (1890–1937): painter and etcher
 Daisy Mary Rossi (1879–1974): artist, interior designer and writer
 Dick Roughsey (1920–1985): painter
 Ellis Rowan (1847–1922): naturalist and illustrator
 Julie Rrap (born 1950): contemporary artist
 Dattilo Rubbo (1870–1955): Italian-born artist and art teacher
 Craig Ruddy (born 1968): painter of portraits, nudes and self studies, winner of 2004 Archibald Prize
 James Newton Russell AM MBE (1909–2001): cartoonist
 John Peter Russell (1858–1930): impressionist painter
 Robert Russell (1808–1900): architect and surveyor

Back to top

S

 Jenny Sages (born 1933): Chinese-born painter, freelance writer, and illustrator
 Loudon Sainthill (1918–1969): artist and stage and costume designer
 William Arthur Salmon (1928–2018): painter
 Tom Samek (1950–2021): Czech-born muralist
 Gareth Sansom (born 1939): artist, painter, printmaker and collagist 
 Hugh Sawrey (1919–1999): landscape artist and stockman
 Jan Hendrik Scheltema (1861–1941): Dutch-born landscape and livestock painter. 
 Jörg Schmeisser (1942–2012): painter, printmaker and art teacher
 Joyce Scott (born 1942): drawing, oil painting and ceramics
 Montague Scott (1835–1909): artist
 Ken Searle (born 1951): artist
 Udo Sellbach (1927–2006): artist, printmaker and art teacher 
 Gert Sellheim (1901–1970): German-Australian artist who won the Sulman Prize in 1939 
 Jan Senbergs (born as Jānis Šēnbergs in Latvia, 1939): artist and printmaker
 Dora Serle (1875–1968): painter
 Peter Serwan (born 1962): artist and teacher 
 Rebecca Shanahan: artist
 Martin Sharp (1942–2013): artist, underground cartoonist, songwriter and filmmaker
 Peter Sharp (born 1964): specialises in drawing
 Raelene Sharp (born 1957): portrait painter Archibald Prize Packing Room Winner 2012
 Wendy Sharpe (born 1960): portraitist and war artist
 Gary Shead (born 1942): artist and filmmaker who won the Archibald Prize in 1992–1993
 Ben Shearer (born 1941): artist who specialises in watercolour painting of the Outback
 Shen Jiawei (born 1948): Chinese Australian painter and winner of the 2006 Sir John Sulman Prize
 Kathleen Shillam AM (1916–2002): English-born sculptor
 Leonard George Shillam AM (1915–2005): sculptor
 Heather Shimmen (born 1957): artist, printmaker
 John Shirlow (1869–1936): artist
 Athol Shmith (1914–1990): studio portrait and fashion photographer and photography educator 
 Ivy Shore (1915–1999): painter, winner of Portia Geach Memorial Award
 Andrew Sibley (1933–2015): English-born artist
 Allan F. Sierp (1905–1982): artist and author 
 Wolfgang Sievers (1913–2007): photographer who specialised in architectural and industrial photography
 Achille Simonetti (1838–1900): Italian-born sculptor
 Norah Simpson (1895–1974): modernist painter
 Darren Siwes (born 1968): photographer, painter
 Rein Slagmolen (1916–1999): Dutch-Australian artist and sculptor
 Matthew Sleeth (born 1972:) visual artist and filmmaker
 Jeffrey Smart (1921–2013): painter, known for his modernist depictions of urban landscapes
 Sally Smart (born 1960): known for her large-scale assemblage installations that address gender and identity politics
 Tony Smibert (born 1949): painter who specialises in watercolour painting
 Bernard Smith (1916–2011): art historian, art critic and academic
 Eric Smith (1919–2017): portraitist
 Grace Cossington Smith (1892–1984): artist and pioneer of modernist painting
 Joshua Smith (1905–1995): artist who won the Archibald Prize in 1944
 Mervyn Ashmore Smith OAM (1904–1994): artist
 Lance Solomon (1913–1989): painter, noted for his landscapes
 David Henry Souter (1862–1935): artist and journalist
 Clara Southern (1861–1940): painter
 Percy Spence (1868–1933): artist
 John Spooner (born 1946): journalist and illustrator 
 Ethel Spowers (1890–1947): artist associated with the Grosvenor School of Modern Art
 William Stanford (1839–1880): sculptor
 Stelarc (born 1946): performance artist
 Ronald Steuart (1898–1988): watercolourist
 Paddy Japaljarri Stewart (1935–2013): indigenous artist from Mungapunju
 Constance Stokes (1906–1991): figurative painter
 Loribelle Spirovski (born 1990): Filipino-born visual artist
 Kunmanara Stewart (c.1935-2012): indigenous Pitjantjatjara artist 
 Margaret Stones AM MBE (1920–2018): botanical illustrator
 Tim Storrier (born 1949): Australian landscape painter, winner of 2012 Archibald Prize
 David Edgar Strachan (1919–1970): painter, printmaker and teacher
 George Strafford (c.1820–1896): artist and engraver
 Arthur Streeton (1867–1943): landscape painter
 Mark Strizic (1928–2012): Croatian-Australian photographer and artist
 William Strutt (1825–1915): English-born artist of figurative and history paintings
 Douglas Stubbs (1927–2008): artist
 Reginald Sturgess (1892–1932): artist
 Charles Summers (1825–1878): English-born sculptor, creator of the memorial to the explorers Burke and Wills
 Jane Sutherland (1853–1928): landscape painter 
 Ruth Sutherland (1884–1948): Australian painter and art critic
 Chern’ee Sutton (born 1996): Australian painter, known for her colourful 3D painting style.
 Roger Swainston (born 1960): painter, naturalist and zoologist specialising in works of the underwater world
 Ricky Swallow (born 1974): sculptor
 Estelle Mary (Jo) Sweatman (1872–1956): painter
 Eveline Syme (1888–1961): artist associated with the Grosvenor School of Modern Art

Back to top

T

 Laurens Tan (born 1950): multidisciplinary artist
 Ronald Peter Tandberg (1943–2018): illustrator and political cartoonist
 Les Tanner (1927–2001): cartoonist and journalist
 Howard Taylor AM (1918–2001): painter, potter, graphic artist and teacher of art
 Violet Teague (1872–1951): artist, noted for her painting and printmaking
 Henri Tebbitt (1854–1927): English-Australian painter
 Kathy Temin (born 1968): artist who uses synthetic fur to create sculptural objects and installations
 Arlene Textaqueen (born 1975): works on paper with felt-tip marker pens
 Eric Thake (1904–1982): surrealist artist
 Harold Thomas (born 1947): artist and activist
 Margaret Thomas (1842–1929): English-born Australian travel writer, poet and artist
 Rover Thomas (c.1926–1998): one of two Aboriginal Australians to exhibit in the Venice Biennale in 1990, alongside Trevor Nickolls
Stu Thomas (born 1967): Visual artist, musician.
 Christian Thompson (born 1978): artist
 Nigel Thomson (1945–1999): artist of satirical paintings of society
Lesbia Thorpe (1919–2009); printmaker
 Mark Threadgold (born 1977): painter
 Imants Tillers (born 1950): visual art artist, curator and writer
 Freddie Timms (1946–2017): painter
 Richard Kelly Tipping (born 1949): poet and artist working between image and language
 Kaapa Mbitjana Tjampitjinpa (1925–1989): painter
 Clifford Possum Tjapaltjarri (1932–2002): painter, Aboriginal artist
 Whiskey Tjukangku (born c. 1939): artist
 Turkey Tolson Tjupurrula (c.1938/1942–2001)
 Aida Tomescu (born 1955): contemporary artist
 Mary Tonkin (born 1973): artist, winner of the 2002 Dobell Prize
 Jessie Constance Alicia Traill (1881–1967): print maker
 Vernon Treweeke (1939–2015): psychedelic artist
 Percy Trezise AM (1923–2005): pilot, painter, explorer and writer
 J. W. Tristram (1870–1938): artist
 Zoja Trofimiuk (born 1952): printmaker and sculptor, especially cast glass
 Marie Tuck (1866–1947): artist and art educator
 Ruth Tuck OAM (1914–2008): modernist painter 
 Albert Tucker (1914–1999): Expressionist painter
 Tudor St George Tucker (1862–1906): painter 
 Tony Tuckson (1921–1973): war-time pilot turned abstract expressionist painter
 Peter Tully (1947–1992): jeweller, designer and artistic director
 James Alfred Turner (1850–1908): painter
 Isabel May Tweddle (1875–1945): painter

Back to top

U

 Tony Underhill (1923–1977)

Back to top

V

 Hossein Valamanesh (born 1949: Iranian-born contemporary artist
 May Vale (1862–1945): painter
 Henri Benedictus van Raalte (1881–1929): known as H. van Raalte, English-born artist and printmaker
 Danila Vassilieff (1897–1958): Russian-born painter and sculptor
 John Vickery (1906–1983): artist
 Julie Elizabeth Agnes Vieusseux (1820–1878): painter and educator
 Alfred James Vincent (1874–1915): cartoonist
 Eugene von Guerard (1811–1901): Austrian-born painter of landscapes active in Australia
 Savanhdary Vongpoothorn (born 1971): Laotian-born Australian painter
Back to top

W

 Robert Wade (born 1930): watercolour artist
 David Wadelton (born 1955): artist 
 Thomas Wainewright (1794–1847): English author, serial killer, forger and painter transported to Van Dieman's Land
 Roland Wakelin (1887–1971): New Zealand-born painter and teacher
 Megan Walch (born 1967): painter
Anna Frances Walker (1830–1913) watercolorist, botanical illustrator
 John Walker (born 1939): English-born painter and printmaker producing native Oceanic art
 Rose A. Walker (1879–1942): painter and miniaturist
 Stephen Walker (1927–2014): sculptor
 Robin Wallace-Crabbe (born 1938): curator, literary reviewer, cartoonist, illustrator, book designer, publisher and a commenter on art
 Mervyn Napier Waller CMG OBE (1893–1972): muralist, mosaicist and painter in stained glass and other media 
 Wes Walters (1928–2014): realist portrait painter and abstract artist
 Ania Walwicz (1951–2020): poet, prose writer, and visual artist
 Guy Warren (born 1921): painter who won the Archibald Prize in 1985
 Sera Waters (born 1979): textile artist, arts writer and arts educator
 Thomas Watling (1762–1814): painter and illustrator
 Jennifer Watson (born 1951): artist known for her paintings that combine text and images
 Judy Watson (born 1959): artist
 Judy Napangardi Watson (1921–2004): painter
 Tommy Watson (c.1935–2017): painter
 James Laurence Watts (1849–1925): sculptor
 Betty Temple Watts (1901–1992): scientific illustrator
 Peter Wegner (born 1953): New Zealand born figurative painter, sculptor, and draughtsman
 Barbara Weir (born 1945): painter
 William Westall (1781–1850): English-born landscape and botanical artist
 Bradd Westmoreland (born 1975): painter
 Bryan Westwood (1930–2000): portrait artist who won the Archibald Prize twice
 Charles Wheeler (1881–1977): painter who won the Archibald Prize in 1933
 George Whinnen (1891–1950): painter
 Kaylene Whiskey: artist
 Anthony White (born 1976): painter
 Cecil John White (1900–1986): New Zealand born cartoonist, known under the pen name Unk White
 James White (1861–1918): sculptor, winner of the Wynne Prize in 1902
 Susan Dorothea White (born 1941): painter, sculptor, printmaker, author
 Brett Whiteley (1939–1992): prolific, multi-award-winning painter
 James V Wigley (1918–1999): painter of Aboriginal camp scenes and desert landscapes
 Leslie Wilkie (1878–1935): artist, curator, and member of Victorian Artists Society
 Fred Williams (1927–1982): painter and printmaker
 Jan Williamson: award-winning portraitist
 Marcus Wills (born 1972): painter, winner of 2006 Archibald Prize
 Dora Wilson (1883–1946): British-born artist, best known for etchings and street scenes
 Eric Wilson (1911–1946): painter
 Shaun Wilson (born 1972): artist, film maker, academic, teacher, and curator
 William Hardy Wilson (1881–1955): architect, artist and author
 Henry Winkles (1800–1860)
 Walter Withers (1854–1914): landscape artist and a member of the Heidelberg School of impressionists
 Noel Wood (1912–2001): painter
 Rex Wood (1906–1970): artist who lived for many years in Portugal
 Robert Raymond (Bob) Woodward AM (1923–2010): architect and fountain designer
 John Christie Wright (1889–1917): sculptor

Back to top

X

 Ah Xian (born 1960): Chinese born artist

Back to top

Y

 Paji Honeychild Yankarr (c.1912–2004): painter
 Yirawala (c.1897–1976): painter
 John Zerunge Young (born 1956): Hong Kong-born Australian artist
 Blamire Young (1862–1935): artist
 William Young (1875–1944): artist
 Gulumbu Yunupingu (c.1943–2012): Australian Aboriginal artist and women's leader from the Yolngu people

Back to top

Z

 Anne Zahalka (born 1957): photographer
 Michael Zavros (born 1974): artist
 Victor Zelman (1877–1960): painter and etcher
 Hongbin Zhao (born 1952): Shanghai born artist
 Teisutis 'Joe' Zikaras (1922–1991): Lithuanian-born sculptor
 Salvatore Zofrea (born 1946): Italian-born painter of literary, historical and religious sources
 Reinis Zusters (1919–1999) artist and architect

Back to top

See also
 Art of Australia 
 Australian painter stubs

Schools

 Antipodeans Group
 Heide Circle
 Heidelberg School
 Hermannsburg School
 Merioola Group

References

External links
 Design & Art Australia Online

 
Artists
Lists of artists by nationality
Artists